Wesco is a Michigan company that operates convenience stores throughout West Michigan.  It is based in North Muskegon, Michigan.

History

Wesco was founded in 1952 by Bud Westgate. In the 1980s and 1990s, the company expanded by acquiring Rengo Oil (15 stores) and Weaver Oil (19 stores). Wesco now owns and operates a bulk fuel and propane business under the name Wesco Energy, along with six Subway locations and six Wesco Deli locations.

Locations

Wesco is a chain of 53 convenience stores based in Muskegon, Michigan. Some locations feature a deli that serves pizza and sandwiches. At some locations, they are also known for their popcorn.

Wesco Bakery

Wesco has a bakery in Norton Shores, Michigan where they make "Fresh Every Day" Donuts, Muffins, Cookies, and more. Many Wesco locations also have in-store bakeries.

Wesco Deli

Wesco operates 6 Wesco Deli locations in Grand Haven, Fremont, New Era, Whitehall, Belding, and Rothbury.

Awards

Wesco was named one of West Michigan's 101 Best and Brightest Places to Work in 2010, 2011, 2012, and 2013. In 2016 Wesco was recognized as one of the 101 Best and Brightest Places to Work in the nation.

Data Compromise

In late 2006, customers that used credit cards at WESCO Convenience Stores, as well as several other Michigan businesses, were subject to identity theft.  This caused credit card companies to reissue thousands of new cards.

External links
Wesco
Profile at Google Finance

References

Muskegon, Michigan
West Michigan
Companies based in Michigan
American companies established in 1952
Energy companies established in 1952
Automotive fuel retailers
Convenience stores of the United States
1952 establishments in Michigan